Murcray Heights is a cluster of prominent heights that rise to  at the south end of Sickle Ridge, Royal Society Range, Victoria Land. It is named after the Murcray brothers, David G. and Frank H., and Frank J. Murcray (son of David G.), University of Denver, long term specialists in infrared spectroscopy in Antarctica.

References

Mountains of Victoria Land
Scott Coast